Anisur Rahman is a Bangladeshi politician of the Jatiya Party (Ershad) and the former Member of Parliament of Undivided Mymensingh-6 and Mymensingh-7. He was the organizer of the Liberation War of Bangladesh.

Career
Anisur Rahman was elected to parliament from Undivided Mymensingh-6 as a Bangladesh Awami League candidate in 1973. He was elected to parliament from Mymensingh-7 as a Jatiya Party candidate in 1988. He was the organizer of the Liberation War of Bangladesh.

He lost the 5th Jatiya Sangsad elections of 1991 from the Mymensingh-7 constituency with the nomination of Jatiya Party.

References

Living people
Year of birth missing (living people)
Jatiya Party politicians
Awami League politicians
1st Jatiya Sangsad members
4th Jatiya Sangsad members